Funny Girl may refer to:

 Funny Girl (musical), 1964 Broadway musical with music by Jule Styne, lyrics by Bob Merrill and which starred Barbra Streisand
 Funny Girl (Original Broadway Cast Recording), 1964 album and original Broadway cast recording of the musical
 Funny Girl (film), 1968 film based on the stage musical
 Funny Girl (soundtrack), the soundtrack album to the 1968 musical film
 "Funny Girl" (Barbra Streisand song), 1968 song from the film sung by Barbra Streisand
 Funny Girl (Fiona album), 2005 album by Cantopop artist Fiona Sit
 Funny Girl (novel), a 2014 novel by Nick Hornby
 "Funny Girl" (Laura Rizzotto song), a 2017 song that represented Latvia in the Eurovision Song Contest 2018
 Funny Girls, a burlesque cabaret bar in  Blackpool, Lancashire, England, UK
 Funny Girls (TV series), a New Zealand comedy television series airing from 2016–2018
 "Funny Girl", 2022 song by Father John Misty from the album Chloë and the Next 20th Century

See also
 Comedienne
 Funny Man (disambiguation)
 Girls (disambiguation)
 Girl (disambiguation)